"Skeletun" is a song recorded by Nigerian singer-songwriter Tekno, it was released on October 8, 2019, by the Cartel Entertainment. It was written by Tekno and  produced by Phantom. 
The song was featured on the soundtrack to Coming 2 America. It debuted at number 19 on the first ever official UK Afrobeats Singles Chart and was nominated for Best Pop Single at The Headies 2020.

Background and reception

Tekno's pandering set benefits greatly from the "Skeletun" production. The hit song is obviously made to appeal to club-hopping people with catchphrases like "e don tey wey we dey shayo" and lyrics appreciating a love interest's physique, especially with peak flexing and concert season on the horizon.
The music video was released this same day,  on the 8 October 2019, directed by TG Omori

Commercial performance

The video debut on Soundcity's Naija Top 20,  and also on MTV Base's Official Naija Top 10. It debuted 19 at the first ever official UK Afrobeats Singles Chart and was nominated for Best Pop Single at The Headies 2020. 
On March 5, 2021, Def Jam Recordings, in conjunction with Def Jam Africa, release the 'Rhythms of Zamunda,' the original soundtrack to the sequel of Eddie Murphy's 1988 classic Coming 2 America, the soundtrack features original songs from African artistes including 'Skeletun'. 
OkayAfrica describe it that 'Tekno introduces his newest terms to the afropop lexicon with "skeletun," "kelepu," and "keletu" over a tasty highlife rhythm. "Skeletun," which is amusing and illogical, was created by a talented musician who is always learning new musical depths.' and include it on the Best Nigerian Songs of the Month (October).

Accolades

The song was nominated for Best Pop Single at The Headies 2020.

Release history

References

2019 songs
2019 singles
Nigerian afropop songs